Christine Margaret Scott (born 17 March 1946) is a former Australian politician. She was a Labor member of the Legislative Assembly of Queensland from 2001 to 2004, representing the seat of Charters Towers.

Scott was born in Broome in Western Australia, and gained a Graduate Diploma in Information Studies, a Bachelor of Teaching (Adult and Further Education) and a Diploma of Education (Adult and Community Education). She was self-employed before her election to parliament, and was also a member of the Premier's Council for Women. In 2001, she won the seat of Charters Towers in that year's Labor landslide, but she was defeated in 2004.

References

1946 births
Living people
Members of the Queensland Legislative Assembly
Australian Labor Party members of the Parliament of Queensland
21st-century Australian politicians
Women members of the Queensland Legislative Assembly
21st-century Australian women politicians